Trafford Publishing is a company for self-publishing using print-on-demand technology, formerly based in Victoria, British Columbia, Canada, and now based in Bloomington, Indiana, USA.

History

The company was founded in 1995, by Bruce and Marsha Batchelor, John Norris and Steve Fisher. Bruce Batchelor served as CEO until 2006. Trafford Publishing focuses on print-on-demand ("POD") publishing, which means they print shorter runs or even one copy at a time, in response to orders from the author or from retail customers

At its peak size, Trafford had about 150 employees working at offices in Canada, USA, UK and Ireland. Trafford's self-publishing service was sold to Author Solutions Inc. in 2009.

Trafford requires payment from the author to cover set-up costs, and the author has to do most of his or her own marketing. Unlike most other POD publishing services, Trafford owned its own large printing plant, located in Victoria. Book printing was also done through Lightning Source Inc. (LSI), a subsidiary of Ingram Books distributors, in Tennessee and Milton Keynes as well as at BookSurge LLC's plant in South Carolina.

Some titles have been converted to e-books and are distributed via Powells.com and Lightning Source Inc. (LSI).

According to their publishing guide, a number of packages are available. They range from a basic publishing service to order printed copies (for family histories, etc.), an intermediate package for basic online ordering capability, to a package with internet distribution. Trafford also has packages for publishing color children's books.

The company has distribution options in Europe.

In 2009 Trafford was purchased by Author Solutions, which operates AuthorHouse and iUniverse and is owned by the San Mateo, Calif., private-equity firm Bertram Capital Management LLC. Previously, in January 2009, the Bloomington, Ind., publisher acquired another competitor, Xlibris.

References

External links
 Trafford Publishing

Publishing companies established in 1995
Book publishing companies of Canada
Self-publishing companies
2009 mergers and acquisitions